Pantelleria National Park (Italian: Parco Nazionale Isola de Pantelleria) is an Italian national park on the island of Pantelleria.

External links
 Parco Nazionale Isola di Pantelleria (official site)
 Parco Nazionale Isola di Pantelleria (Parks.it)

References

National parks of Italy
Parks in Sicily